The 2000 WUSA Foreign Player Allocation took place on October 30, 2000.  It was the first international draft held by Women's United Soccer Association (WUSA) to assign the rights of international players to the eight American-based teams.  The 16 players were paired and each team selected one pair.

Round 1

Round 2

Round 3

Round 4

Round 5

Round 6

Round 7

Round 8

Draft notes
Each team had already been allocated three national team players ("founders") on May 24, 2000. The teams then arranged the order for the foreign player allocation between themselves, using a voting system which took account of the previous allocation. The 16 players to be allocated included some of the top players from around the world. Eight of them, including all four Brazilians, had signed for the league the day before the draft. The players were packaged into pairs as part of an effort to help them adapt to life in America.

A 15-round main draft, which also included foreign players, followed on December 10–11, 2000. A supplemental college draft on February 4, 2001 completed the process before the inaugural season began in April 2001. In common with Major League Soccer, WUSA had a single-entity ownership structure. This meant that the league office owned the players' contracts and negotiated all agreements. Each team got an $800,000 salary cap to cover their final roster of 20 players.

Sports Illustrated soccer journalist Grant Wahl described Philadelphia's second round pick of Smith and Fitschen ahead of Sissi and Kátia as "a boneheaded move". The slur angered Smith, who later extracted an apology from Wahl.

References

2001
Foreign